The 1984–85 Yugoslav Ice Hockey League season was the 43rd season of the Yugoslav Ice Hockey League, the top level of ice hockey in Yugoslavia. Eight teams participated in the league, and Jesenice have won the championship.

First round

Final round

Final
Jesenice – Red Star 3–0 (9–6, 9–2, 8–5)

Placing round

External links
Season on hokej.snt.cz

Yugoslav
Yugoslav Ice Hockey League seasons
1984–85 in Yugoslav ice hockey